Anoplostomatidae is a family of nematodes belonging to the order Enoplida.

Genera:
 Anoplostoma Bütschli, 1874

References

Nematodes